Saint-Georges-de-Windsor is a municipality in Quebec, Canada.

References

External links
 

Municipalities in Quebec
Incorporated places in Estrie
Canada geography articles needing translation from French Wikipedia